FC Luzern Frauen is a women's football club from Lucerne, Switzerland. The team is the successor of the women's section of FC Sursee, and was named SC LUwin.ch at the start.

History

LUwin.ch
After the Swiss Football Association allowed dedicated women's football clubs to be founded in 2004, SC LUwin.ch announced independence by founding Switzerland's first purely women's club. In the club's former name LU stands for Luzern, win shows the team's winner mentality, .ch is for Switzerland.

The team was 2 time Swiss champion, when LUwin.ch was founded and three titles followed directly in the next seasons. In 2007-08 the team began to struggle with a 7th-place finish in the Nationalliga A (women's football). Only a better goal difference than FC Rot-Schwarz Thun prevented relegation. The next season Luwin.ch finished last and was relegated to the Nationalliga B. The 2009–10 season was a disaster for the team. After 18 games, the team only had 5 points to its name and was relegated into the local 1. Liga, the third level of Swiss women's football.

Merger with SC Kriens
For the 2014–15 season three teams of SC Kriens joined FC Luzern. They were a team in the Nationalliga A, and Under-18 and U-16 youth teams. The merger was agreed on to join forces in the central Switzerland region.

European Record
UEFA Women's Cup:
2002-03: Second qualifying round, 2nd place (as FC Sursee)
2005-06: Second qualifying round, 3rd place (as FC Lucerne)

Titles 
 Swiss champion (5):
2002, 2003 (as FC Sursee), 2004, 2005, 2006 (as LUwin.ch)
Swiss Women's Cup (4):
2002, 2004 (as FC Sursee), 2005, 2006 (as LUwin.ch)

References

External links 
Official website

Women's football clubs in Switzerland
Sport in Lucerne
Association football clubs established in 2004
2004 establishments in Switzerland